The Szeleta Culture is a transitional archaeological culture between the Middle Paleolithic and the Upper Palaeolithic, found in Austria, Moravia, northern Hungary, and southern Poland. It is dated 41,000 to 37,000 years before the present (BP), and is named after Szeleta Cave in the Bükk Mountains, part of the North Hungarian Mountains.

It was preceded by the Bohunician (48,000–40,000 BP), and is roughly contemporary with the Aurignacian (43,000–26,000 BP) in France, and the Uluzzian (45,000–37,000 BP) in Italy. It was succeeded by the Gravettian (33,000–21,000 BP).

The initial excavation of the Szeletian cave was carried out from 1906 to 1913 by Ottocar Kadić. The idea of a distinctive Szeletian culture was advocated by the Czechoslovak archaeologist František Prošek (1922–1958).

Neanderthals or modern humans
It has been called the most original and also the most aboriginal Upper Palaeolithic culture in Central Europe. The findings are often interpreted in terms of the contemporaneity of Neandertal and modern man, "as the product of acculturation at the boundary of Middle and Upper Paleolithic." However, the absence of human remains makes it impossible to attribute the culture to Neanderthals or modern humans.

Lithic industry
The lithic industry is characterized by:
 Bifacial foliated points and sidescrapers
 Prismatic and discoid debitage
 Presence of Micoquien hand axes
Later assemblages contain endscrapers and retouched blades.

Sites
In addition to the Szeletian cave in Hungary, assemblages have been found in Dzierzyslaw and Lubotyń (Poland), at Čertova Pec in Slovakia, and at Pod Hradem (Moravia).

References

External links

Industries (archaeology)
Upper Paleolithic cultures of Europe
Archaeological cultures in Hungary
Archaeology of Central Europe
Peopling of Europe
Archaeology of the Czech Republic
Archaeology of Eastern Europe